Conteh is a common surname among the Limba people and Temne people of Sierra Leone, and may refer to:

Abdul Thompson Conteh, Sierra Leonean football player
Abdulai Conteh, Sierra Leonean politician
Alfred Amadu Conteh, American artist
Alfred Paolo Conteh, Sierra Leone's defense minister
Aniru Conteh, Sierra Leonean physician
Denni Conteh, former Danish footballer of Sierra Leonean descent
John Conteh, former British boxing champion
Kandeh Baba Conteh, Sierra Leonean politician
Kewullay Conteh, Sierra Leonean football player
Lamin Junior Tumbu Conteh, Sierra Leonean football player

Surnames of African origin